KVB may refer to:

 The KVB, a British audio-visual music duo
 Contrôle de vitesse par balises or KVB, a train protection system used on the French railway network
 Karur Vysya Bank, an Indian private sector bank
 Kölner Verkehrs-Betriebe, the municipal public transit company of Cologne, Germany